Al-Zafaraniya Sport Club, is an Iraqi football team based in Baghdad, that plays in the Iraq Division Two.

Current squad

First-team squad

Current technical staff

{| class="toccolours"
!bgcolor=silver|Position
!bgcolor=silver|Name
!bgcolor=silver|Nationality
|- bgcolor=#eeeeee
|Coach:||Habib Jaafar||
|- 
|Assistant coach:||Riyadh Kamil||
|- bgcolor=#eeeeee
|Goalkeeping coach:||Saif Mohammed||
|- 
|Team supervisor:||Ahmed Shaye||
|- 
|media coordinator :||Ahmed Al Quraishi||
|-

See also 
 2020–21 Iraq FA Cup

References

External links
 Al-Zafaraniya SC on Goalzz.com
 Iraq Clubs- Foundation Dates

Football clubs in Baghdad